The following radio stations broadcast on FM frequency 100.8 MHz:

China 
 CNR The Voice of China in Fuxin
 CNR Business Radio in Kaifeng

Germany
 Bremen 4

Taiwan
 International Community Radio Taipei in Chiayi, Yunlin County

Ukraine
 in Lviv Oblast

References

Lists of radio stations by frequency